Joseph Clayton Love (died 1925) was an Irish politician. He was a Cumann na nGaedheal member of Seanad Éireann from 1922 to 1925. He was defeated at the 1925 Seanad election.

References

Year of birth missing
1925 deaths
Cumann na nGaedheal senators
Members of the 1922 Seanad
People from County Cork